Wild grape may refer to:

 Vitis species; specially Vitis vinifera subsp. sylvestris (the wild ancestor of Vitis vinifera), Vitis californica (California wild grape), Vitis girdiana (desert wild grape), and Vitis riparia
 Ampelocissus acetosa, also known as Djabaru
 Ampelopsis glandulosa, also known as porcelain berry
 Cyphostemma juttae, a slow-growing ornamental plant.

References
Wild grape at Integrated Taxonomic Information System